"You Make Me Feel So Young" is a 1946 popular song composed by Josef Myrow, with lyrics written by Mack Gordon. It was introduced in the 1946 musical film Three Little Girls in Blue, where it was sung by the characters performed by Vera-Ellen and Charles Smith (with voices dubbed by Carol Stewart and Del Porter).

The song was recorded by Frank Sinatra in 1956, and performed frequently throughout his career. His version is featured in the 2003 movie Elf  and is included in the albums Songs for Swingin' Lovers! and Sinatra at the Sands.

Many other artists, including Ella Fitzgerald, Helen Reddy, and Michael Buble, have covered the song.

References

1946 songs
Songs with lyrics by Mack Gordon
Songs with music by Josef Myrow
1940s jazz standards